İzmir State Symphony Orchestra is an orchestra located in İzmir, Turkey.

Its principal conductor is Rengim Gökmen.

Turkish symphony orchestras
Culture in İzmir
Ministry of Culture and Tourism (Turkey)
Symphony orchestras